L'Huisserie is a commune in the Mayenne department in north-western France.

It boards the Jouanne river.

Gallery

See also
Communes of the Mayenne department

References

Huisserie